Jericho Union Free School District is an American School district in Jericho, New York. It began in 1959 with the completion of Jericho High School. The district contains three elementary schools, one middle school and one high school. The current Superintendent of Schools is Henry L. Grishman.

Overview
Jericho UFSD serves the community of Jericho, as well as parts of Westbury, Old Westbury, Brookville and Muttontown.

In 2017, the district was ranked the best school district in New York State and the twelfth best in the country by Niche.

Budget
For 2012-2013, Jericho Public School district spent a total of US$114,468,464 for a projected number of 3004 students. US$38,105 will be spent per student, which is US$457,264 for a student studying for 12 years from Grade 1 to 12, or US$914,528 for a household with 2 students.

In 2011-2012, Jericho Public School district spent a total of US$111,962,251 for 3026 students of K-12. US$37,000 was spent per student, which is US$444,000 for a student studying for 12 years from Grade 1 to 12, or US$888,000 for a household with 2 students.

Schools

Secondary schools 
Jericho High School (Grades 9–12)
Jericho Middle School (Grades 6–8)

Elementary schools 
Cantiague Elementary School (Grades K–5)
Robert Seaman Elementary School (Grades K–5)
George A. Jackson Elementary School (Grades K-5)

References

External links
 

Education in Nassau County, New York
School districts in New York (state)
School districts established in 1959